Precious Blood Church of Holyoke, Massachusetts, burned on May 27, 1875, killing 78 people. There was a crush of people through the entrance at the back left and many people could not leave. It is one of the deadliest fires in American history, and was also known by newspapers domestic and foreign as "The Holyoke Disaster".

Event

The fire started at the front of the church as a candle flame ignited a curtain.

Panic caused people to rush from the upper levels to a front door. The door was made to open inward only, so many were trapped against the door. Reverend Andre Dufresne was the parish priest. He tried to calm the people and direct them as much as possible.

The event and its aftermath were also later depicted in some detail in the Franco-American novel Mirbah by Emma Port-Joli Dumas, originally published in Holyoke's La Justice.

Location

The church complex is located on the city block formed by Cabot, South East, Clemente, and Hamilton Streets. The wooden church had been built in 1870 and was replaced in 1876 by a brick church. The Park Street School was located on the other side of Hamilton Street between Park and South East Streets. The school was used as a temporary morgue for the fire victims. Only the convent and rectory remain today since the brick church and school were dismantled. 

The cemetery is on Willimansett Street Extension near the intersection of Routes 33 and 202 in South Hadley. There is a monument for the dead at the church cemetery. The parish priest was also reburied there. The black memorial is in the center of the cemetery and the priest is buried behind that.

Fatalities 

A list of the dead is given below by first and last name and then age. Many were buried in a common grave on May 29 at the Precious Blood Cemetery in South Hadley. All were French Canadians.

The names have been taken directly from the monument. The list on the monument was compiled from the Holyoke Deaths Register and from various newspaper articles.  Some French names may have been recorded incorrectly due to the use of English rather than French spelling conventions.

Notes

References

External links

History of Holyoke, Massachusetts
1875 disasters in the United States
1875 in Massachusetts
Fires in Massachusetts
French-Canadian American history
May 1875 events
1875 fires in the United States